Cydia latifemoris is a moth of the family Tortricidae. It was first described by Lord Walsingham in 1907. It is endemic to the Hawaiian islands of Maui and possibly Hawaii.

The larvae feed on Sophora chrysophylla. They can destroy nearly one-half of the seed crop of their host plant.

External links

Species info

Grapholitini
Endemic moths of Hawaii